Philoscia muscorum, the common striped woodlouse or fast woodlouse, is a common European woodlouse. It is widespread in Europe, the British Isles and is found from southern Scandinavia to the Ukraine and Greece. It has also spread to Washington and many states in New England, also the mid-Atlantic states of Pennsylvania and New Jersey, as well as Nova Scotia.

Description
P. muscorum may reach  in length, with a shiny body which is mottled and greyish-brown in colour. The fast woodlouse is, as its name suggests, faster than other common species; its body is raised up off the ground rather more than the others and the head is always very dark in colour.

Classification
Twelve subspecies are recognised:

Philoscia muscorum albescens Collinge, 1918
Philoscia muscorum aureomaculata Collinge, 1918
Philoscia muscorum biellensis Verhoeff, 1936
Philoscia muscorum dalmatia Verhoeff, 1901
Philoscia muscorum frigidana Verhoeff, 1928
Philoscia muscorum maculata Collinge, 1918
Philoscia muscorum marinensis Verhoeff, 1933
Philoscia muscorum muscorum (Scopoli, 1763)
Philoscia muscorum rufa Legrand, 1943
Philoscia muscorum standeni Collinge, 1917
Philoscia muscorum triangulifera Verhoeff, 1918
Philoscia muscorum virescens Collinge, 1917

See also
List of woodlice of the British Isles

References

Woodlice
Crustaceans described in 1763
Woodlice of Europe
Taxa named by Giovanni Antonio Scopoli